Hilltop Country Day School is an independent, nonsectarian coeducational day school located in Sparta, in Sussex County, New Jersey, United States. The school serves students in preschool through eighth grade.  The school is divided into an Early Childhood Division (preschool, prekindergarten and kindergarten), a Lower school (grades 1-4) and Upper School (grades 5-8). The school is led by Head of School Ms. Laura McGee and by a Board of Trustees composed of members of the community.

Hilltop Country Day School is an accredited member of the New Jersey Association of Independent Schools and a member of the National Association of Independent Schools.

Facilities

Since 1972, Hilltop Country Day School has been located in the center of Sparta between Lafayette Road and Sparta Avenue. The addition included several new classrooms and a modern art studio, science lab and library and provides a new home for the Upper School and preschool programs.

Hilltop also has an open field available for Physical Education classes, recess and special events.

Student Body and Curriculum
All students attend classes in Language Arts, Mathematics, Social Studies and Science, as well as supplementary classes in Music, Art, Art History, Physical Education and Computer Technology.  Hilltop also provides a strong program in World Language, with students having the option of French or Spanish, beginning in preschool. Students in grades 5 will also take one trimester of Mandarin Chinese through the Berlitz Virtual Classroom program. Students in kindergarten through grade 8 will be able to study Mandarin through the Berlitz Program in a new Enrichment Program offering after school.

Early Childhood 
The Early Childhood Division consists of students in preschool-kindergarten. Preschoolers must be 2 1/2 and independently toilet trained to be considered for admission.

Lower School
The Lower School program consists of students in first grade through fourth grade.

Upper School
The Upper School consists of students in the fifth through eighth grade and uses a curriculum integrated with that of the Lower School.

In recent years, graduates have attended competitive local high schools including Blair Academy, Newark Academy and the Peddie School, as well as local public high schools.

PEAKS Program
The PEAKS program pairs younger and older students together to participate together in activities designed to teach students respect for others, teamwork and to smooth the transition between the Lower and Upper Schools. The parings are as follows:
 Prek-4th grade
 Kindergarten-5th grade
 1st grade-6th grade 
 2nd grade-7th grade
 3rd grade-8th grade

Other programs

Hilltop also runs several ancillary programs.

Extended Day and Enrichment Programs
The Extended Day program provides both supervised homework help and Enrichment Program offerings including chess club, karate instruction, a robotics program and Kiddie Soccer.

Summer programs
Hilltop offers a summer camp experience called Camp Apogee. This camp is a blend of S.T.E.A.M enrichment and traditional summer fun and swimming in the afternoon at The Lake Mohawk Pool. Camp Apogee is for children ages 5 to 13 and is open to non-Hilltop students.

External links
School website
There oughta be a law ...Three Jersey boys rally against homework, Township Journal, September 4, 2008
 Data for Hilltop Country Day School, National Center for Education Statistics

Schools in Sussex County, New Jersey
New Jersey Association of Independent Schools
Private elementary schools in New Jersey
Private middle schools in New Jersey